The ethics of care (alternatively care ethics or EoC) is a normative ethical theory that holds that moral action centers on interpersonal relationships and care or benevolence as a virtue. EoC is one of a cluster of normative ethical theories that were developed by some feminists and environmentalists since the 1980s. While consequentialist and deontological ethical theories emphasize generalizable standards and impartiality, ethics of care emphasize the importance of response to the individual. The distinction between the general and the individual is reflected in their different moral questions: "what is just?" versus "how to respond?". Carol Gilligan, who is considered the originator of the ethics of care, criticized the application of generalized standards as "morally problematic, since it breeds moral blindness or indifference".

Some assumptions of the theory are basic: 
 Persons are understood to have varying degrees of dependence and interdependence on one another.
 Other individuals affected by the consequences of one's choices deserve consideration in proportion to their vulnerability.
 Situational details determine how to safeguard and promote the interests of those involved.

Historical background

Carol Gilligan and In a Different Voice
The originator of the ethics of care (EoC) was Carol Gilligan, an American ethicist and psychologist. Gilligan was a student of developmental psychologist Lawrence Kohlberg. Gilligan developed EoC in contrast to her mentor's theory of stages of moral development. She held that measuring progress by Kohlberg's model resulted in boys being found to be more morally mature than girls, and this held for adult men and women as well (although when education is controlled for there are no gender differences). Gilligan further argued that Kohlberg's model was not an objective scale of moral development. Gilligan considered it as a masculine perspective on morality, founded on justice and abstract duties or obligations. Dana Ward has stated, in a paper that appears never to have been formally published for critical peer review, that the scale is psychometrically sound.

Gilligan's In a Different Voice offered the perspective that men and women have tendencies to view morality in different terms. Her theory claimed women tended to emphasize empathy and compassion over the notions of morality that are privileged in Kohlberg's scale.

Subsequent research suggests that the discrepancy in being oriented towards care-based or justice-based ethical approaches may be based on gender differences, or on differences in actual current life situations of the genders.

Relationship to traditional ethical positions
Care ethics contrasts with more well-known ethical models, such as consequentialist theories (e.g. utilitarianism) and deontological theories (e.g. Kantian ethics), in that it seeks to incorporate traditionally feminized virtues and values which, proponents of care ethics contend, are absent in such traditional models of ethics. One of these values is the placement of caring and relationship over that of logic and reason. In care ethics reason and logic are subservient to natural care, that is care that is done out of inclination, which is contrary to deontology where actions taken out of inclination are unethical.

Drawing on this critique of utilitarianism and deontology, the American philosopher of social science Jason Josephson Storm has categorized the ethics of care as a type of virtue ethics. Specifically, in his 2021 book Metamodernism, Storm argued for close parallels between the ethics of care and traditional Buddhist virtue ethics, especially the prioritization of compassion by Śāntideva and others. Other scholars had also previously connected ethics of care with Buddhist ethics.

Care ethics as feminist ethics

While some feminists have criticized care-based ethics for reinforcing traditional stereotypes of a "good woman", others have embraced parts of this paradigm under the theoretical concept of care-focused feminism.

Care-focused feminism, alternatively called gender feminism, is a branch of feminist thought informed primarily by ethics of care as developed by Carol Gilligan and Nel Noddings. This body of theory is critical of how caring is socially engendered, being assigned to women and consequently devalued.  "Care-focused feminists regard women's capacity for care as a human strength" which can and should be taught to and expected of men as well as women. Noddings proposes that ethical caring has the potential to be a more concrete evaluative model of moral dilemma, than an ethic of justice.  Noddings' care-focused feminism requires practical application of relational ethics, predicated on an ethic of care.

Ethics of care is also a basis for care-focused feminist theorizing on maternal ethics. These theories recognize caring as an ethically relevant issue. Critical of how society engenders caring labor, theorists Sara Ruddick, Virginia Held, and Eva Feder Kittay suggest caring should be performed and care givers valued in both public and private spheres. This proposed paradigm shift in ethics encourages the view that an ethic of caring be the social responsibility of both men and women.

Joan Tronto argues that the definition of the term "ethic of care" is ambiguous due in part to the lack of a central role it plays in moral theory. She argues that considering moral philosophy is engaged with human goodness, then care would appear to assume a significant role in this type of philosophy. However, this is not the case and Tronto further stresses the association between care and "naturalness". The latter term refers to the socially and culturally constructed gender roles where care is mainly assumed to be the role of the woman. As such, care loses the power to take a central role in moral theory.

Tronto states there are four ethical qualities of care: 
Attentiveness: Attentiveness is crucial to the ethics of care because care requires a recognition of others' needs in order to respond to them. The question which arises is the distinction between ignorance and inattentiveness. Tronto poses this question as such, "But when is ignorance simply ignorance, and when is it inattentiveness"?
Responsibility: In order to care, we must take it upon ourselves, thus responsibility. The problem associated with this second ethical element of responsibility is the question of obligation. Obligation is often, if not already, tied to pre-established societal and cultural norms and roles. Tronto makes the effort to differentiate the terms "responsibility" and "obligation" with regards to the ethic of care. Responsibility is ambiguous, whereas obligation refers to situations where action or reaction is due, such as the case of a legal contract. This ambiguity allows for ebb and flow in and between class structures and gender roles, and to other socially constructed roles that would bind responsibility to those only befitting of those roles.
Competence: To provide care also means competency.  One cannot simply acknowledge the need to care, accept the responsibility, but not follow through with enough adequacy - as such action would result in the need of care not being met.
Responsiveness: This refers to the "responsiveness of the care receiver to the care". Tronto states, "Responsiveness signals an important moral problem within care: by its nature, care is concerned with conditions of vulnerability and inequality". She further argues responsiveness does not equal reciprocity. Rather, it is another method to understand vulnerability and inequality by understanding what has been expressed by those in the vulnerable position, as opposed to re-imagining oneself in a similar situation.

In 2013, Tronto added a fifth ethical quality: 
Plurality, communication, trust and respect; solidarity or caring with: Together, these are the qualities necessary for people to come together in order to take collective responsibility, to understand their citizenship as always imbricated in relations of care, and to take seriously the nature of caring needs in society.

In mental health
Psychiatrist Kaila Rudolph noted that care ethics aligns with a trauma-informed care framework in psychiatry.

See also

Theorists

References

Further reading
 
 
 
 
 
 
 
 

Care
Altruism
Environmentalism
Ecofeminism
Feminism
Feminist ethics
Liberalism
Left-wing politics
Progressivism
Relational ethics
Social justice
Feminist philosophy
Concepts in ethics